Lisa Marie De Vanna (born 14 November 1984) is an Australian professional soccer player who plays as a forward for Perth Glory. She has previously played for Adelaide Sensation, Western Waves, Doncaster Rovers Belles, AIK, Perth Glory, Washington Freedom, Brisbane Roar, magicJack, Newcastle Jets, Linköping, Sky Blue FC, Melbourne Victory, Boston Breakers, Washington Spirit, Melbourne City, North Shore Mariners, Orlando Pride, Canberra United, South Melbourne, Sydney FC, and Fiorentina as well as representing the Australian national team 150 times. She is noted for her pace and dribbling skills.  She has been regularly considered one of the greatest female footballers in the world; football analyst and former Socceroo Craig Foster stated that she "ran on jet-fuel; burning up twice as fast, but with incredible impact."

Early life
De Vanna was born in Perth, Western Australia to a Portuguese mother and an Italian father. She was born and raised in the small port city of Fremantle, located about 30 minutes southwest of Perth. De Vanna developed her love for the game of football at a young age and has said that she slept with her soccer ball and spent much of her time as a youth playing soccer in the street with her brother.

De Vanna is a Portuguese speaker.

Club career

Doncaster Rovers Belles L.F.C., 2006–07 
In October 2006 De Vanna signed for Doncaster Rovers Belles, departing the English Premier League club in March 2007.

AIK Fotboll Dam, 2008
De Vanna played for Swedish club AIK for the 2008 Damallsvenskan season.  De Vanna had a very successful season, being the 5th highest goalscorer with 15 goals, helping AIK to their most successful season.

Perth Glory, 2008–09
In November 2008, De Vanna was signed to Perth Glory in the Australian W-League and made her first appearance for the club on 8 November 2008 against the Melbourne Victory.

Washington Freedom / magicJack, 2009–11
In September 2008, De Vanna was selected by Washington Freedom in Women's Professional Soccer. She was the 18th overall selection in the 2008 WPS International Draft. She officially signed for the Freedom in late March 2009. Through the next three years, she played for Washington Freedom and its successor magicJack in the WPS as well as Perth Glory, Brisbane Roar and Newcastle Jets in the W-League in Australia.

Linköping FC, 2012

After the WPS suspended operations, De Vanna signed for Damallsvenskan club Linköpings FC. She scored five goals in her first eight games including a hat trick against Piteå IF on 3 June 2012.  During a match against Kopparberg/Göteborg FC on 14 October 2012, she scored the game-winning goal in the 82nd minute helping her team win 3–2. Linköping finished third during the regular season with an 11–6–5 record. De Vanna finished the 2012 season having started in 18 of the 22 matches in which she played and scored seven goals.

Sky Blue FC, 2013
On 1 February 2013, it was announced that De Vanna signed with Sky Blue FC for the inaugural season of the National Women's Soccer League, the top division in the United States. In June 2013, De Vanna scored a bicycle kick goal and was named the league's Player of the Week. Her goal garnered international attention and went viral on websites like YouTube and soccer-related websites. She was also voted NWSL Fans' Choice MVP for Week 8. During a game against the Western New York Flash on 21 July 2013, De Vanna was sidelined with a hamstring injury. De Vanna started in 16 of the 17 games in which she played and scored five goals. Sky Blue finished in fourth during the regular season with a 10–6–6 record.

Melbourne Victory, 2013–14
In October 2013, it was confirmed that De Vanna had signed for Melbourne Victory for the 2013–14 W League season.

Boston Breakers, 2014
On 3 March 2014, Sky Blue FC traded De Vanna to the Boston Breakers in exchange for a 2014 international roster spot and the Breakers' first-round 2015 college draft pick, which became Sarah Killion.

Washington Spirit, 2014
On 18 June 2014, the Boston Breakers traded De Vanna to Washington Spirit in exchange for defender and Mexican international Bianca Sierra and the Spirit's fourth and fifth round 2015 college draft picks.

Melbourne Victory, 2014–15
In September 2014 it was confirmed that De Vanna signed to play with Melbourne Victory again.

Melbourne City, 2015–16
Having played a season with the Victory, De Vanna was lured across the city to Victory's A-League rivals, Melbourne City, becoming the brand new W-League side's very first signing.

Orlando Pride, 2016
On 29 August 2016, De Vanna joined Orlando Pride. After playing three matches in the 2016 National Women's Soccer League season, she was waived by Orlando Pride before the 2017 National Women's Soccer League season.

Canberra United, 2016–17
In December 2016, De Vanna joined Canberra United as a guest player for the remainder of the 2016–17 W-League season.

South Melbourne, 2017
On 7 April 2017, De Vanna joined South Melbourne to play in the Women's National Premier League. She finished the season with 18 goals in 16 matches, including a 4-goal haul on 28 August 2017 in a 7–0 rout of Bulleen Lions.

Sydney FC, 2017–2019
On 2 October 2017, De Vanna joined Sydney FC.

Fiorentina, 2019–2020
In August 2019, De Vanna joined Italian club Fiorentina.

Melbourne Victory, 2020–2021
In December 2020, De Vanna returned to the W-League, signing with Melbourne Victory once more. At the end of the season, she was named in the PFA's W-League Team of the Season together with five team-mates.

Perth Glory, 2021–present
A couple of months after announcing her international retirement, De Vanna decided to return to the game, re-joining her former club Perth Glory. The decision was in part related to the efforts of coach Alex Epakis and chairman Tony Sage to foster a safe, supportive, and respectful environment at the club.

International career
De Vanna played four games at the 2004 Olympic Football Tournament.

She scored four goals for Australia in the 2007 World Cup — one in a 1–1 draw against Norway, two in a 4–1 victory against Ghana, and one against Brazil in her team's 2–3 loss in the quarterfinals. Each goal she scored at the World Cup was dedicated to her father, who died three months before the tournament began.

On 1 October 2007 Lisa was named in the FIFA's Women's World Cup All Star Team and she was also nominated for the 2007 FIFA World Player of the Year award. She was named Western Australian Sportswoman of the Year in 2007. After returning home after the World Cup De Vanna returned to a job at a petrol station.

In May 2011 De Vanna was sent home from a training camp held to prepare the national team for the World Cup. Australian coach Tom Sermanni stated that the expulsion was for an unacceptable standard of behaviour. The previous September, De Vanna had been subject to a complaint after photographs involving a large inflatable penis were posted to her Facebook page. She was censured by Football Federation Australia and instructed to remove the offending pictures. De Vanna moved to Sweden for the 2012–13 season, but discussed that her desire to play for The Matildas was then stronger than ever.

On 8 June 2015 De Vanna captained the Matilda's in her 100th game, scoring their only goal in a 3–1 defeat to the United States in the 2015 FIFA Women's World Cup. During a match against Brazil in the 2016 Olympics, a moment of De Vanna and teammate Elise Kellond-Knight went viral when during a short break, De Vanna absentmindedly tried to drink from the wrong end of a water bottle, prompting Kellond-Knight to quickly flip it in her hand.

Presently, De Vanna is the second highest goal scorer in Matildas history after Sam Kerr, with 47.

Matches and goals scored at World Cup and Olympic tournaments
Lisa De Vanna has competed in four FIFA Women's World Cup tournaments: China 2007, Germany 2011,Canada 2015, and France 2019 and two Olympics: Athens 2004 and Rio 2016; altogether played 23 matches and scored 8 goals at those six global tournaments.

Managerial
De Vanna was appointed as a Technical Assistant for the FFV National Training Centre in September 2018.

Career statistics

International goals

Honours

Club
 Brisbane Roar
 W-League Championship: 2010–11

Melbourne Victory
 W-League Championship: 2013–14, 2020–21

Melbourne City
 W-League Championship: 2015–16
 W-League Premiership: 2015–16

Sydney FC
 W-League Championship: 2018–19

Country
 Australia
 OFC U-20 Women's Championship: 2002
 AFC Women's Asian Cup: 2010
 AFC Olympic Qualifying Tournament: 2016

Individual
 Julie Dolan Medal: 2002–03
 Women's National Soccer League Golden Boot: 2002–03
 FIFA Women's World Cup All-Star Team: 2007, 2015
 FIFA Puskás Award nominee: 2013
 FFA Female Footballer of the Year: 2013

In popular culture

Television and film

Leading up to the 2011 FIFA Women's World Cup, De Vanna was the focus of an ESPN documentary, Unstoppable, directed by award-winning filmmaker, Safina Uberoi. In 2013, she was featured in an hour-long episode of ESPN's Aussies Abroad entitled, The Matildas, which profiled four Australian national team players (De Vanna, Samantha Kerr, Kyah Simon, and Caitlin Foord) and their experience playing internationally.

See also
 List of women's footballers with 100 or more caps
 List of foreign Damallsvenskan players
 List of foreign NWSL players

References

Match reports

Further reading

External links

 

1984 births
Living people
Australian women's soccer players
Olympic soccer players of Australia
Perth Glory FC (A-League Women) players
Brisbane Roar FC (A-League Women) players
Newcastle Jets FC (A-League Women) players
Melbourne Victory FC (A-League Women) players
Melbourne City FC (A-League Women) players
Canberra United FC players
Sydney FC (A-League Women) players
Sportswomen from Western Australia
Washington Freedom players
MagicJack (WPS) players
Doncaster Rovers Belles L.F.C. players
Expatriate women's soccer players in the United States
FA Women's National League players
Expatriate women's footballers in Sweden
Australian people of Italian descent
Australian people of Portuguese descent
Australian expatriate sportspeople in England
Expatriate women's footballers in England
Footballers at the 2004 Summer Olympics
Footballers at the 2016 Summer Olympics
2007 FIFA Women's World Cup players
2011 FIFA Women's World Cup players
2015 FIFA Women's World Cup players
People educated at John Curtin College of the Arts
Australian Institute of Sport soccer players
NJ/NY Gotham FC players
A-League Women players
National Women's Soccer League players
Women's Professional Soccer players
Damallsvenskan players
Linköpings FC players
Soccer players from Perth, Western Australia
Australia women's international soccer players
Women's association football forwards
Washington Spirit players
Boston Breakers players
Australian expatriate sportspeople in the United States
FIFA Century Club
Orlando Pride players
Australian expatriate sportspeople in Sweden
2019 FIFA Women's World Cup players
Fiorentina Women's F.C. players
Serie A (women's football) players
South Australian Sports Institute soccer players
Australian expatriate women's soccer players
Expatriate women's footballers in Italy
Australian expatriate sportspeople in Italy